Neills Creek is a  long 4th order tributary to the Cape Fear River in Harnett County, North Carolina.  Neill Creek is the only stream of its name in the United States.

Variant names
According to the Geographic Names Information System, it has also been known historically as:
Kenneth Creek
Neal Creek
Neals Creek
Neils Creek

Course
Neills Creek rises in a pond in Holland, North Carolina in Wake County and then flows south to Harnett County to join the Cape Fear River about 1 mile north of Lillington, North Carolina.

Watershed
Neills Creek drains  of area, receives about 46.6 in/year of precipitation, has a wetness index of 446.81 and is about 33% forested.

See also
List of rivers of North Carolina

References

Rivers of North Carolina
Rivers of Harnett County, North Carolina
Rivers of Wake County, North Carolina
Tributaries of the Cape Fear River